This is a list of notable strip clubs, both active and defunct. A strip club is a venue where strippers provide adult entertainment, predominantly in the form of striptease or other erotic or exotic dances.

Strip clubs

Multinational

Canada

 
 
 
 House of Lancaster operated an Etobicoke venue from 1982 to 2017 and operates a Toronto location since 1983.

France

United Kingdom

United States

Oregon

 The Carriage Room was a strip club in Portland. The bar and restaurant closed in 1988.

See also
 List of strippers
 Bada Bing! – a fictional strip club from the HBO drama television series The Sopranos
 Sex industry

References

Strip clubs
Lists of entertainment venues
Lists of companies